Bajofondo Remixed is an album by Bajofondo. It includes remixes of tracks originally from the Bajofondo Tango Club and Supervielle albums, remixed in 2005 in Buenos Aires, Montevideo, Córdoba, Paris and New York.

Track listing
"Perfume" (Calvi & Neill zurdo jazz remix) - 8:03
"Pulso" (Alexkid remix) – 5:42
"Montserrat" (Capri remix) – 6:19
"Leonel El Feo" (Romina Cohn & Carlos Shaw remix) – 5:49
"Perfume" (Calvi & Neill bouquet remix) – 5:18
"Pulso" (Omar remix) – 5:10
"Décollage" (Cristóbal Paz & Leo Di Giusto remix) – 5:31
"Miles De Pasajeros" (Omar remix) – 4:02
"Mateo Y Cabrera" (Mercurio remix) – 4:44
"Mi Corazón" (Castelli remix) – 7:20
"Miles De Pasajeros" (Androoval remix)(www.androoval.tk) – 6:37
"Los Tangueros" (Castelli & Ackerman remix) – 7:19

External links

Bajofondo albums
2006 remix albums